Busy line interrupt, also known as emergency breakthrough, is a function on land line telephones that allows a caller to interrupt a phone conversation of another caller, especially one who does not have call waiting. It can usually only be initiated by request to the telephone operator.

Much like long distance calling before the late 1990s, busy line interrupt is a service provided, for instance, to allow people to contact a family member in the event of an emergency if the receiving party's line is busy and the news cannot wait.

The service is not free and is charged whether or not the calling party can reach the person on the other end (as the phone just might be off the hook for privacy reasons or the line might be connected to the internet).  For this reason, it is usually only used in cases of emergencies as noted above.

References

External links
US Patent 7133515 - Subscriber control of busy line interrupt and line treatment codes
Operator Services & Directory Assistance
Operator Services - Interexchange Carriers - V5.0

Calling features